Eretmocera benitonis is a moth of the family Scythrididae. It was described by Strand in 1913. It is found in Equatorial Guinea.

The length of the forewings is about 5.3 mm. The forewings are black with a blue-green sheen dorsally and irregularly and sparsely scattered with reddish, indistinct scales. The ventral side is purplish, brown-black, towards the base paler. The hindwings are as the ventral side of the forewings dorsally and ventrally, but are sometimes slightly lighter. Adults have been recorded on wing in August.

References

benitonis
Moths described in 1913